A by-election in the Moray constituency of the Scottish Parliament was held on 27 April 2006 following the death of the Scottish National Party (SNP) Member of the Scottish Parliament (MSP) Margaret Ewing on 21 March 2006, from breast cancer. The seat was successfully defended by the SNP's Richard Lochhead, increasing the majority over the Scottish Conservative Party by 1073 votes.

Margaret Ewing had held the Holyrood seat since its creation in 1999, having previously represented the Moray constituency as a Westminster Member of Parliament (MP) since the 1987 United Kingdom general election. She had already announced that she would not be contesting the seat in the 2007 Scottish Parliament election.

Result

Notes on candidates
Richard Lochhead defended the seat for the Scottish National Party. An additional-member MSP for the North East Scotland electoral region since 1999, he had already been selected to contest the seat for the SNP at the 2007 Scottish Parliament election, beating the incumbent's sister-in-law, former MP Annabelle Ewing. He resigned his list seat to stand in the by-election.

Mary Scanlon, a Conservative MSP for the Highlands and Islands region (which includes Moray), resigned from her list seat to fight as the Conservative candidate. Any sitting MSP intending to fight the by-election must first resign their current seat under section 9 of the Scotland Act.

The Labour candidate was Elgin councillor Sandy Keith. He saw his party's vote share fall in the by-election, resulting in increases for all the other parties.

The Liberal Democrat candidate was Linda Gorn, came fourth when she fought the seat in 2003 but improved her performance substantially in the by-election, moving to third place not far behind the Conservative candidate and increasing her share of the vote more than any other candidate.

The Scottish Socialist Party announced that they would not be entering a candidate. They decided that they, in common with the Scottish Green Party, will concentrate on campaigning for regional list votes (Additional member system) at the next 2007 Scottish Parliament election.

Melville Brown, a former Conservative Party candidate for Edinburgh East, stood for the NHS First Party, the first time the party has contested an election. Brown is the party chairman.

2003 election result

Campaign controversies
The Conservative Party became embroiled in a row with two local independent councillors. Handwritten notes were sent out in their wards allegedly from the councillors, but the councillors subsequently denied having given permission for the letters to be used.

The following week, a local newspaper, the Northern Scot, reported the Liberal Democrats to the Electoral Commission for attributing quotes in leaflets to the newspaper itself rather than to the specific Liberal Democrats whom the paper had been quoting.

Both of the above were given widespread coverage in the Northern Scot newspaper.

In the final week of the by-election, Robbie Rowantree, the Conservative Party candidate for the neighbouring UK Parliament constituency of Inverness, Nairn, Badenoch and Strathspey in the 2005 general election, announced he was joining the Liberal Democrats.

See also
Elections in Scotland
List of by-elections to the Scottish Parliament

References

External links
Scottish Election Results 1997 - present

2006 elections in the United Kingdom
2006 in Scotland
2000s elections in Scotland
Moray 2006
Politics of Moray
21st century in Moray
April 2006 events in the United Kingdom